Rémy Rochas (born 18 May 1996 in La Motte-Servolex) is a French professional road cyclist, who currently rides for UCI WorldTeam .

Major results

2013
 6th Overall Tour du Valromey
1st  Mountains classification
 6th Overall Giro di Basilicata
2015
 6th Overall Kreiz Breizh Elites
2016
 1st Stage 2 Ronde de l'Isard
 8th Overall Kreiz Breizh Elites
2017
 6th Overall Ronde de l'Isard
2018
 5th Overall Tour of Almaty
 6th Tour du Gévaudan Occitanie
2020
 4th Overall Sibiu Cycling Tour
2021
 5th Veneto Classic
 8th Overall Volta a la Comunitat Valenciana
 8th Overall Tour de l'Ain
2022
 2nd Giro del Veneto
 8th Veneto Classic

Grand Tour general classification results timeline

References

External links

1996 births
Living people
French male cyclists
Université Savoie-Mont Blanc alumni
Sportspeople from Savoie
Cyclists from Auvergne-Rhône-Alpes